Premier was a Russian UCI Continental cycling team.

Major wins
2007
Grand Prix of Moscow, Roman Klimov
Mayor Cup, Denis Galimzyanov
Overall Way to Pekin, Alexey Kunshin

References

Defunct cycling teams based in Russia
Cycling teams established in 2006
Cycling teams disestablished in 2007
UCI Continental Teams (Europe)
2006 establishments in Russia
2007 disestablishments in Russia